Wulf Koronia Kluivert Shevcengko Horota (born 13 January 2001) is an Indonesian professional footballer who plays as a left back for Liga 1 club Persipura Jayapura.

Club career

Persipura Jayapura
He was signed for Persipura Jayapura to play in Liga 1 in the 2021 season. Horota made his first-team debut on 30 October 2021 in a match against Persib Bandung at the Manahan Stadium, Surakarta.

Career statistics

Club

Notes

References

External links
 Wulf Horota at Soccerway
 Wulf Horota at Liga Indonesia

2001 births
Living people
Indonesian footballers
Persipura Jayapura players
Liga 1 (Indonesia) players
Association football defenders
People from Jayapura
Sportspeople from Papua